Michael Gordon Roberts (born ) is a former Wales international rugby union player. He attended Ruthin School. In 1971 he toured New Zealand with the British & Irish Lions and at the time played club rugby for London Welsh RFC.

Notes

1946 births
Living people
Barbarian F.C. players
British & Irish Lions rugby union players from Wales
London Welsh RFC players
Oxford University RFC players
Surrey RFU players
Wales international rugby union players
Welsh rugby union players
People educated at Ruthin School